Annia Galeria Faustina the Elder, sometimes referred to as Faustina I or Faustina Major (born on February 16 around 100; died in October or November of 140), was a Roman empress and wife of the Roman emperor Antoninus Pius. The emperor Marcus Aurelius was her nephew and later became her adopted son, along with Emperor Lucius Verus.  She died early in the principate of Antoninus Pius, but continued to be prominently commemorated as a diva, posthumously playing a prominent symbolic role during his reign.

Early life
Faustina was the only known daughter of consul and prefect Marcus Annius Verus and Rupilia Faustina. Her brothers were consul Marcus Annius Libo and praetor Marcus Annius Verus. Her maternal aunts were Roman Empress Vibia Sabina and Matidia Minor. Her paternal grandfather was named Marcus Annius Verus, like her father, while her maternal grandparents were suffect consul Lucius Scribonius Libo Rupilius Frugi Bonus and possibly Vitellia. Faustina was born and raised in Rome.

While a private citizen, she married Antoninus Pius between 110 and 115. Faustina bore four children with Pius: two sons and two daughters. These were:
 Marcus Aurelius Fulvius Antoninus (died before 138); his sepulchral inscription has been found at the Mausoleum of Hadrian in Rome.
 Marcus Galerius Aurelius Antoninus (died before 138); his sepulchral inscription has been found at the Mausoleum of Hadrian in Rome. He is commemorated by a high-quality series of bronze coins, possibly struck at Rome, though their language is Greek.
 Aurelia Fadilla (died in 135); she married Aelius Lamia Silvanus or Syllanus. She appears to have had no children with her husband and her sepulchral inscription has been found in Italy.
 Annia Galeria Faustina Minor or Faustina the Younger (between 125–130 to 175), a future Roman Empress; she married her maternal cousin, future Roman Emperor Marcus Aurelius. She was the only child who survived to see Antoninus and Faustina elevated to the imperial rank.

According to the unreliable Historia Augusta, there were rumours while Antoninus was proconsul of Asia that Faustina conducted herself with "excessive frankness and levity".

Empress

On July 10, 138, her uncle, the emperor Hadrian, died and her husband became the new emperor, as Antoninus was Hadrian's adopted son and heir. Faustina became Roman Empress and the Senate accorded her the title of Augusta.  As empress, Faustina was well respected and was renowned for her beauty and wisdom.  Throughout her life, as a private citizen and as empress, Faustina was involved in assisting charities for the poor and sponsoring and assisting in the education of Roman children, particularly girls. A letter between Fronto and Antoninus Pius has sometimes been taken as an index of the latter's devotion to her.

After Antoninus Pius' accession to the principate, the couple never left Italy; instead, they divided their time between Rome, Antoninus' favourite estate at Lorium, and other properties at Lanuvium, Tusculum, and Signia.

Faustina's personal style was evidently much admired and emulated. Her distinctive hairstyle, consisting of braids pulled back in a bun behind or on top of her head, was imitated for two or three generations in the Roman world.

Several provincial groups chose to honour her while she was empress: a company of couriers in Ephesus named themselves after her, while a company of clapper-players in Puteoli dedicated an altar to her in her lifetime.

Death and legacy 

Faustina died near Rome in 140, perhaps at Antoninus Pius's estate at Lorium. Antoninus was devastated at Faustina's death and took several steps to honor her memory. He had the Senate deify her (her apotheosis was portrayed on an honorary column) and dedicate the Temple of Faustina to her in the Roman Forum. Because of this, Faustina was the first Roman empress with a permanent presence in the Forum Romanum. The Senate authorized gold and silver statues of her, including an image to appear in the circus, where it might be displayed in a carpentum (a kind of covered waggon) or currus elephantorum (a cart drawn by elephants). Antoninus also ordered various coins with her portrait struck, inscribed DIVA FAVSTINA ("Divine Faustina") and elaborately decorated. He also established a charity called Puellae Faustinianae ("Girls of Faustina") to assist orphaned Roman girls and created a new alimenta (see Grain supply to the city of Rome). Her remains were interred in the Mausoleum of Hadrian. Certain cities struck coin issues in honour of the "divine Faustina"; the most notable such cities were Delphi, Alexandria, Bostra, and Nicopolis. Martin Beckmann suggests that the coins of Nicopolis might have been minted at Rome and given out as imperial largesse at the Actian Games. The coins issued in the wake of Faustina's funeral illustrate her elaborate funeral pyre, which may have influenced the design of later private mausolea; the deities Pietas and Aeternitas, among others; and an eagle (or less often a winged genius) bearing a figure aloft, with the legend CONSECRATIO (i.e. Faustina's ascension into heaven). Coins of Faustina were sometimes incorporated into jewellery and worn as amulets.

The posthumous cult of Faustina was exceptionally widespread, and Faustina's image continued to be omnipresent throughout Antoninus Pius' principate. A colossal marble head, believed to be that of Faustina and discovered in 2008, figured as one of several monumental imperial statues at the ancient site of Sagalassos in today's Turkey. In Olympia, Herodes Atticus dedicated a nymphaeum that displayed statues of Faustina and other Antonines as well as his own ancestors. Faustina also appears on the Parthian Monument at Ephesus commemorating members of the imperial family. Bergmann and Watson have characterized the commemoration of Faustina as central to Antoninus Pius' political persona. One larger-than-life statue, discovered in situ near the Termini railway station at Rome, appears to depict Faustina as Concordia, with a patera and cornucopia; it would have been displayed alongside statues of Diana Lucifera and Apollo-Sol in baths privately owned but available to the public.

Antoninus and Faustina were officially held up as such exemplars of conjugal harmony that newlyweds were directed to pray at an altar of Antoninus and Faustina that they might live up to their example. This was evidently the case in Ostia, and probably so in Rome.

The Temple of Faustina is thought to have been dedicated in 144. It is a grand hexastyle structure with Corinthian columns, possibly designed originally to be a temple of Ceres. Depictions on coins appear to show a cult image of Faustina seated on a throne and holding a tall staff in her left hand. Faustina's portrait on coins from this period is often crowned as well as veiled, which may also recall a feature of Faustina's cult image from the temple.

The deified Faustina was associated particularly closely with Ceres, who featured prominently on coins of Faustina; for some years, the torch-bearing Ceres was the dominant motif in her gold coinage. Herodes Atticus venerated Faustina as the “new Demeter” (the Greek equivalent of Ceres) at a private sanctuary he established outside Rome, now the church of Sant'Urbano. In addition to Ceres, Vesta and Juno feature prominently in Faustina's coinage. She was also associated with the Magna Mater and at Cyrene with Isis; at Sardis she was worshipped conjointly with Artemis.

Ten years after Faustina's death, a new commemorative coinage was introduced, featuring the legend Aeternitas ('eternity'); such coins may have been introduced to be distributed at a public ceremony in her memory.

After Antoninus Pius' death, his adoptive sons and successors Marcus Aurelius and Lucius Verus erected the Column of Antoninus Pius, which dramatically depicted Antoninus and Faustina being elevated heavenward together on the back of a winged figure.

Marcus Aurelius also built a Temple of Faustina at Elefsina in Greece.

Faustina continued to be commemorated in certain Renaissance depictions as a “model wife”.

Notes

Sources

 
 
 
 
 
 

100s births
140 deaths
2nd-century Roman empresses
Deified Roman empresses
Year of birth uncertain
Annii
Augustae
Burials at the Castel Sant'Angelo
Antoninus Pius